Steve Suissa (born 7 December 1970) is a French film director and actor. His 2000 film Taking Wing was entered into the 22nd Moscow International Film Festival where he won the award for Best Director.

Selected filmography
 Taking Wing (2000)
 A Man and His Dog (2009)
 Turning Tide (2013)

References

External links

1970 births
Living people
French film directors
French male film actors
Male actors from Paris
Cours Florent alumni